Sport- und Kongresshalle is an indoor sporting arena located in Schwerin, Germany.  The capacity of the arena is 8,000 people. It is currently home to the SV Post Schwerin handball team.

Buildings and structures in Schwerin
Handball venues in Germany
Indoor arenas in Germany
Sports venues in Mecklenburg-Western Pomerania
Sport in Schwerin